The Liverpool Courier was a 19th-century conservative newspaper that circulated in Liverpool, England. First published in 1808 as a four-page weekly political paper priced as 6d, it was published and printed by Thomas Kaye. As well as containing political news, the newspaper published details of departing ships, cargoes, ship location updates, births, deaths and bankruptcies.

During its lifetime the paper was renamed multiple times;

Liverpool Courier and Commercial Advertiser (1808–1863)
Daily Courier (1863–1882)
Liverpool Courier (1882–1922)
Liverpool Daily Courier (1922)
Daily Courier (1922–1929)

References

Publications established in 1808
Defunct newspapers published in the United Kingdom
Mass media in Liverpool